The Mena Valley is a municipality of the province of Burgos in Spain.  It is located in the autonomous community of Castile and León, bordering the provinces of Alava, Biscay and Cantabria.

The Mena valley  has 3,926 inhabitants distributed among 43 small villages. Its capital, Villasana de Mena, has 1.554 inhabitants.

Monuments

 Church of San Lorenzo de Vallejo de Mena, Burgos
 Church of Santa Maria de Siones, Burgos

External links
 http://www.valledemena.es

Municipalities in the Province of Burgos